Kiltseva Road (Ring Road) is a street in the Sviatoshynskyi, Solomianskyi and Holosiivskyi District of Kyiv, Ukraine, running along the city's administrative border from Odeska Square in the south where it intersects with the M05 highway to an intersection with the M06 highway and Prospect Peremohy in the north. The road servers as the western bypass of Kyiv, forming the central part of a beltway called the Great Beltway, which as of 2022 covers the part of the city on the right bank of the Dnipro river.

The road is designated as local road T-10-27, and forms a part of European route E40.

History
Kiltseva Road originated in the first half of the 20th century. It was called Okruzhna Street, and from 1965 to 1977 it was called the Great District Road. In 1977, it was connected to Velyka Okruzhna Street in Sviatoshyn (it appeared at the turn of the 19th-20th centuries, until 1965 it was called the 4th Prosika, stretched from Peremohy Avenue to the end of the building near Mykhailo Kotelnikova Street).

Kiltseva Road is the namesake of Kyiv Light Rail station Kiltseva Doroha, closed for reconstruction since 2018.

References

Streets in Kyiv
Ring roads in Ukraine